The Olive Tree is a 1975 Australian TV film starring Alan Cassell and directed by Edgar Metcalfe. It was shot in Western Australia.

References

External links

Australian television films